Palpifer sordida is a moth of the family Hepialidae. It was described by Pieter Cornelius Tobias Snellen in 1900. It is found in Java, Indonesia. Food plants for this species include Alocasia, Amorphophallus, and Dioscorea.

References

Moths described in 1900
Hepialidae